Andris Ārgalis (born August 18, 1944) is a Latvian politician. He was the mayor of Riga from 2000 to 2001.

Andris Ārgalis graduated from the Latvian Academy of Agriculture in 1969.

In 1997 he was elected to the Riga City Council as representative of the For Fatherland and Freedom/LNNK, a Latvian nationalist party. In 2000 and 2001 he was the Riga City Council Chairman (mayor). In a poll conducted in December 2000, he was the third most popular politician in Latvia with a rating 35.4 points on a scale from -100 to +100, after President Vaira Vīķe-Freiberga with 54.6 points and Bank of Latvia President Einars Repše with 52.5 points.

In 2002 he left the City Council Members' office, and was elected a member of Parliament. In 2005 he resigned from Parliament and was re-elected to the Riga City Council, became a deputy mayor and chairman of the board of the Free port of Riga, a post traditionally held by the mayor.

Notes

1944 births
Living people
People from Valmiera Municipality
For Fatherland and Freedom/LNNK politicians
People's Party (Latvia) politicians
Deputies of the 8th Saeima
Mayors of Riga
Latvia University of Life Sciences and Technologies alumni